A trace fossil, also known as an ichnofossil (from  ikhnos "trace, track"), is a fossil record of biological activity but not the preserved remains of the plant or animal itself. Trace fossils contrast with body fossils, which are the fossilized remains of parts of organisms' bodies, usually altered by later chemical activity or mineralization. The study of such trace fossils is ichnology and is the work of ichnologists.

Trace fossils may consist of impressions made on or in the substrate by an organism. For example, burrows, borings (bioerosion), urolites (erosion caused by evacuation of liquid wastes), footprints and feeding marks and root cavities may all be trace fossils. 

The term in its broadest sense also includes the remains of other organic material produced by an organism; for example coprolites (fossilized droppings) or chemical markers (sedimentological structures produced by biological means; for example, the formation of stromatolites). However, most sedimentary structures (for example those produced by empty shells rolling along the sea floor) are not produced through the behaviour of an organism and thus are not considered trace fossils.

The study of traces – ichnology .– divides into paleoichnology, or the study of trace fossils, and neoichnology, the study of modern traces. Ichnological science offers many challenges, as most traces reflect the behaviour – not the biological affinity – of their makers. Accordingly, researchers classify trace fossils into form genera, based on their appearance and on the implied behaviour, or ethology, of their makers.

Occurrence

Traces are better known in their fossilized form than in modern sediments. This makes it difficult to interpret some fossils by comparing them with modern traces, even though they may be extant or even common. The main difficulties in accessing extant burrows stem from finding them in consolidated sediment, and being able to access those formed in deeper water.

Trace fossils are best preserved in sandstones; the grain size and depositional facies both contributing to the better preservation. They may also be found in shales and limestones.

Classification

Trace fossils are generally difficult or impossible to assign to a specific maker. Only in very rare occasions are the makers found in association with their tracks. Further, entirely different organisms may produce identical tracks. Therefore, conventional taxonomy is not applicable, and a comprehensive form of taxonomy has been erected. At the highest level of the classification, five behavioral modes are recognized:
 Domichnia, dwelling structures reflecting the life position of the organism that created it.
 Fodinichnia, three-dimensional structures left by animals which eat their way through sediment, such as deposit feeders;
 Pascichnia, feeding traces left by grazers on the surface of a soft sediment or a mineral substrate;
 Cubichnia, resting traces, in the form of an impression left by an organism on a soft sediment;
 Repichnia, surface traces of creeping and crawling.

Fossils are further classified into form genera, a few of which are even subdivided to a "species" level. Classification is based on shape, form, and implied behavioural mode.

To keep body and trace fossils nomenclatorially separate, ichnospecies are erected for trace fossils. Ichnotaxa are classified somewhat differently in zoological nomenclature than taxa based on body fossils (see trace fossil classification for more information). Examples include:
Late Cambrian trace fossils from intertidal settings include Protichnites and Climactichnites, amongst others
Mesozoic dinosaur footprints including ichnogenera such as Grallator, Atreipus and Anomoepus
Triassic to Recent termite mounds, which can encompass several square kilometers of sediment

Information provided by ichnofossils 

Trace fossils are important paleoecological and paleoenvironmental indicators, because they are preserved in situ, or in the life position of the organism that made them. Because identical fossils can be created by a range of different organisms, trace fossils can only reliably inform us of two things: the consistency of the sediment at the time of its deposition, and the energy level of the depositional environment. Attempts to deduce such traits as whether a deposit is marine or non-marine have been made, but shown to be unreliable.

Paleoecology 
Trace fossils provide us with indirect evidence of life in the past, such as the footprints, tracks, burrows, borings, and feces left behind by animals, rather than the preserved remains of the body of the actual animal itself. Unlike most other fossils, which are produced only after the death of the organism concerned, trace fossils provide us with a record of the activity of an organism during its lifetime.

Trace fossils are formed by organisms performing the functions of their everyday life, such as walking, crawling, burrowing, boring, or feeding. Tetrapod footprints, worm trails and the burrows made by clams and arthropods are all trace fossils.

Perhaps the most spectacular trace fossils are the huge, three-toed footprints produced by dinosaurs and related archosaurs. These imprints give scientists clues as to how these animals lived. Although the skeletons of dinosaurs can be reconstructed, only their fossilized footprints can determine exactly how they stood and walked. Such tracks can tell much about the gait of the animal which made them, what its stride was, and whether or not the front limbs touched the ground.

However, most trace fossils are rather less conspicuous, such as the trails made by segmented worms or nematodes. Some of these worm castings are the only fossil record we have of these soft-bodied creatures.

Paleoenvironment 

Fossil footprints made by tetrapod vertebrates are difficult to identify to a particular species of animal, but they can provide valuable information such as the speed, weight, and behavior of the organism that made them. Such trace fossils are formed when amphibians, reptiles, mammals or birds walked across soft (probably wet) mud or sand which later hardened sufficiently to retain the impressions before the next layer of sediment was deposited. Some fossils can even provide details of how wet the sand was when they were being produced, and hence allow estimation of paleo-wind directions.

Assemblages of trace fossils occur at certain water depths, and can also reflect the salinity and turbidity of the water column.

Stratigraphic correlation 
Some trace fossils can be used as local index fossils, to date the rocks in which they are found, such as the burrow Arenicolites franconicus which occurs only in a  layer of the Triassic Muschelkalk epoch, throughout wide areas in southern Germany.

The base of the Cambrian period is defined by the first appearance of the trace fossil Treptichnus pedum.

Trace fossils have a further utility as many appear before the organism thought to create them, extending their stratigraphic range.

Ichnofacies 

Ichnofacies are assemblages of individual trace fossils that occur repeatedly in time and space. Palaeontologist Adolf Seilacher pioneered the concept of ichnofacies, whereby geologists infer the state of a sedimentary system at its time of deposition by noting the fossils in association with one another. The principal ichnofacies recognized in the literature are Skolithos, Cruziana, Zoophycos, Nereites, Glossifungites, Scoyenia, Trypanites, Teredolites, and Psilonichus. These assemblages are not random. In fact, the assortment of fossils preserved are primarily constrained by the environmental conditions in which the trace-making organisms dwelt. Water depth, salinity, hardness of the substrate, dissolved oxygen, and many other environmental conditions control which organisms can inhabit particular areas. Therefore, by documenting and researching changes in ichnofacies, scientists can interpret changes in environment. For example, ichnological studies have been utilized across mass extinction boundaries, such as the Cretaceous-Paleogene mass extinction, to aid in understanding environmental factors involved in mass extinction events.

Inherent bias 
 
Most trace fossils are known from marine deposits. Essentially, there are two types of traces, either exogenic ones, which are made on the surface of the sediment (such as tracks) or endogenic ones, which are made within the layers of sediment (such as burrows).

Surface trails on sediment in shallow marine environments stand less chance of fossilization because they are subjected to wave and current action. Conditions in quiet, deep-water environments tend to be more favorable for preserving fine trace structures.

Most trace fossils are usually readily identified by reference to similar phenomena in modern environments. However, the structures made by organisms in recent sediment have only been studied in a limited range of environments, mostly in coastal areas, including tidal flats.

Evolution 

This is far too early for them to have an animal origin, and they are thought to have been formed by amoebae.
Putative "burrows" dating as far back as  may have been made by animals which fed on the undersides of microbial mats, which would have shielded them from a chemically unpleasant ocean; however their uneven width and tapering ends make a biological origin so difficult to defend that even the original author no longer believes they are authentic.

During this period the traces and burrows basically are horizontal on or just below the seafloor surface. Such traces must have been made by motile organisms with heads, which would probably have been bilateran animals. The traces observed imply simple behaviour, and point to organisms feeding above the surface and burrowing for protection from predators. Contrary to widely circulated opinion that Ediacaran burrows are only horizontal the vertical burrows Skolithos are also known. The producers of burrows Skolithos declinatus from the Vendian (Ediacaran) beds in Russia with date  have not been identified; they might have been filter feeders subsisting on the nutrients from the suspension. The density of these burrows is up to 245 burrows/dm2. Some Ediacaran trace fossils have been found directly associated with body fossils. Yorgia and Dickinsonia are often found at the end of long pathways of trace fossils matching their shape. The feeding was performed in a mechanical way, supposedly the ventral side of body these organisms was covered with cilia. The potential mollusc related Kimberella is associated with scratch marks, perhaps formed by a radula, further traces from  appear to imply active crawling or burrowing activity.

As the Cambrian got underway, new forms of trace fossil appeared, including vertical burrows (e.g. Diplocraterion) and traces normally attributed to arthropods. These represent a “widening of the behavioural repertoire”, both in terms of abundance and complexity.

Trace fossils are a particularly significant source of data from this period because they represent a data source that is not directly connected to the presence of easily fossilized hard parts, which are rare during the Cambrian. Whilst exact assignment of trace fossils to their makers is difficult, the trace fossil record seems to indicate that at the very least, large, bottom-dwelling, bilaterally symmetrical organisms were rapidly diversifying during the early Cambrian.

Further, less rapid diversification occurred since, and many traces have been converged upon independently by unrelated groups of organisms.

Trace fossils also provide our earliest evidence of animal life on land. Evidence of the first animals that appear to have been fully terrestrial dates to the Cambro-Ordovician and is in the form of trackways. Trackways from the Ordovician Tumblagooda sandstone allow the behaviour of other terrestrial organisms to be determined. The trackway Protichnites represents traces from an amphibious or terrestrial arthropod going back to the Cambrian.

Common ichnogenera 

Anoigmaichnus is a bioclaustration. It occurs in the Ordovician bryozoans. Apertures of Anoigmaichnus are elevated above their hosts' growth surfaces, forming short chimney-like structures.
 Arachnostega is the name given to the irregular, branching burrows in the sediment fill of shells. They are visible on the surface of steinkerns. Their traces are known from the Cambrian period onwards.
 Asteriacites is the name given to the five-rayed fossils found in rocks and they record the resting place of starfish on the sea floor. Asteriacites are found in European and American rocks, from the Ordovician period onwards, and are numerous in rocks from the Jurassic period of Germany.
 Burrinjuckia is a bioclaustration. Burrinjuckia  includes outgrowths of the brachiopod's secondary shell with a hollow interior in the mantle cavity of a brachiopod. 
 Chondrites (not to be confused with stony meteorites of the same name) are small branching burrows of the same diameter, which superficially resemble the roots of a plant. The most likely candidate for having constructed these burrows is a nematode (roundworm). Chondrites are found in marine sediments from the Cambrian period of the Paleozoic onwards. They are especially common in sediments which were deposited in reduced-oxygen environments.
 Climactichnites is the name given to surface trails and burrows that consist of a series of chevron-shaped raised cross bars that are usually flanked on either side by a parallel ridge. The trails were produced on sandy tidal flats during Cambrian time. While the identity of the animal is still conjectural, it may have been a large slug-like animal – its trails produced as it crawled over and processed the wet sand to obtain food.
 Cruziana are excavation trace marks made on the sea floor which have a two-lobed structure with a central groove. The lobes are covered with scratch marks made by the legs of the excavating organism, usually a trilobite or allied arthropod. Cruziana are most common in marine sediments formed during the Paleozoic era, particularly in rocks from the Cambrian and Ordovician periods. Over 30 ichnospecies of Cruziana have been identified. See also Isopodichnus.
 Entobia is a boring produced by endolithic clionaid sponges consisting of galleries excavated in a carbonate substrate; often has swollen chambers with connecting canals.
 Gastrochaenolites are clavate (club-shaped) borings also produced in calcareous hard substrates, usually by bivalves.
 Oikobesalon is an unbranched, elongate burrow with single-entrance and circular cross-section produced by terebellid polychaetes. They are covered with thin lining which has a transverse ornamentation in the form of fusiform annulation.
 Petroxestes is a shallow groove boring produced by mytilacean bivalves in carbonate hard substrates.
 Protichnites consists of two rows of tracks and a linear depression between the two rows. The tracks are believed to have been made by the walking appendages of arthropods. The linear depression is thought to be the result of a dragging tail. The structures bearing this name were typically made on the tidal flats of Paleozoic seas, but similar ones extend into the Cenozoic.
 Rhizocorallium is a type of burrow, the inclination of which is typically within 10° of the bedding planes of the sediment. These burrows can be very large, over a meter long in sediments that show good preservation, e.g. It is thought that they represent fodinichnia as the animal (probably a nematode) scoured the sediment for food.
 Rogerella is a small pouch-shaped boring with a slit-like aperture currently produced by acrothoracican barnacles.
 Rusophycus are bilobed "resting traces" associated with trilobites and other arthropods such as horseshoe crabs.
 Skolithos: One well-known occurrence of Cambrian trace fossils from this period is the famous 'Pipe Rock' of northwest Scotland. The 'pipes' that give the rock its name are closely packed straight tubes- which were presumably made by some kind of worm-like organism. Such traces are known worldwide from sands and sandstones deposited in shallow water environments, from the Cambrian period (542–488 Ma) onwards.
 Thalassinoides are burrows which occur parallel to the bedding plane of the rock and are extremely abundant in rocks, worldwide, from the Jurassic period onwards. They are repeatedly branched, with a slight swelling present at the junctions of the tubes. Thalassinoides sometimes contain scratch marks, droppings or the bodily remains of the crustaceans which made them.
 Teichichnus has a distinctive form produced by the stacking of thin 'tongues' of sediment, atop one another. They are again believed to be fodinichnia, with the organism adopting the habit of retracing the same route through varying heights of the sediment, which would allow it to avoid going over the same area. These 'tongues' are often quite sinuous, reflecting perhaps a more nutrient-poor environment in which the feeding animals had to cover a greater area of sediment, in order to acquire sufficient nourishment.
 Tremichnus is an embedment structure (i.e. bioclaustration) formed by an organism that inhibited growth of the crinoid host stereom.
 Trypanites are elongated cylindrical borings in calcareous substrates such as shells, carbonate hardgrounds and limestones. Usually produced by worms of various types and sipunculids.

Other notable trace fossils
Less ambiguous than the above ichnogenera, are the traces left behind by invertebrates such as Hibbertopterus, a giant "sea scorpion" or eurypterid of the early Paleozoic era. This marine arthropod produced a spectacular track preserved in Scotland.

Bioerosion through time has produced a magnificent record of borings, gnawings, scratchings and scrapings on hard substrates. These trace fossils are usually divided into macroborings and microborings. Bioerosion intensity and diversity is punctuated by two events. One is called the Ordovician Bioerosion Revolution (see Wilson & Palmer, 2006) and the other was in the Jurassic. For a comprehensive bibliography of the bioerosion literature, please see the External links below.

The oldest types of tetrapod tail-and-footprints date back to the latter Devonian period. These vertebrate impressions have been found in Ireland, Scotland, Pennsylvania, and Australia. A sandstone slab containing the track of tetrapod, dated to 400 million years, is amongst the oldest evidence of a vertebrate walking on land.

Important human trace fossils are the Laetoli (Tanzania) footprints, imprinted in volcanic ash 3.7 Ma (million years ago) – probably by an early Australopithecus.

Confusion with other types of fossils 

Trace fossils are not body casts. The Ediacara biota, for instance, primarily comprises the casts of organisms in sediment. Similarly, a footprint is not a simple replica of the sole of the foot, and the resting trace of a seastar has different details than an impression of a seastar.

Early paleobotanists misidentified a wide variety of structures they found on the bedding planes of sedimentary rocks as fucoids (Fucales, a kind of brown algae or seaweed). However, even during the earliest decades of the study of ichnology, some fossils were recognized as animal footprints and burrows. Studies in the 1880s by A. G. Nathorst and Joseph F. James comparing 'fucoids' to modern traces made it increasingly clear that most of the specimens identified as fossil fucoids were animal trails and burrows. True fossil fucoids are quite rare.

Pseudofossils, which are not true fossils, should also not be confused with ichnofossils, which are true indications of prehistoric life.

Gallery of trace fossils

History
Charles Darwin's The Formation of Vegetable Mould through the Action of Worms is an example of a very early work on ichnology, describing bioturbation and, in particular, the burrowing of earthworms.

See also 

 
 
Brutalichnus 
 
 
 
  - fossilized footprints

References

Further reading 

 Bromley, R.G., 1970. "Borings as trace fossils and Entobia cretacea Portlock as an example", pp. 49–90. In: Crimes, T.P. and Harper, J.C. (eds.), Trace Fossils. Geological Journal Special Issue 3.
 Bromley, R.G., 2004. "A stratigraphy of marine bioerosion". In: The application of ichnology to palaeoenvironmental and stratigraphic analysis. (Ed. D. McIlroy), Geological Society of London, Special Publications 228:455–481.
 Palmer, T.J., 1982. "Cambrian to Cretaceous changes in hardground communities". Lethaia 15:309–323.
 
 
 Wilson, M.A., 1986. "Coelobites and spatial refuges in a Lower Cretaceous cobble-dwelling hardground fauna". Palaeontology 29:691–703.
 Wilson, M.A. and Palmer, T.J., 2006. "Patterns and processes in the Ordovician Bioerosion Revolution". Ichnos 13: 109–112.
 Yochelson, E.L. and Fedonkin, M.A., 1993. Paleobiology of Climactichnites, and Enigmatic Late Cambrian Fossil. Smithsonian Contributions to Paleobiology 74:1–74.

External links 

 Encyclopaedia-style article about trace fossils
 Ichnogenus images
 Chuck D. Howell's Ichnogenera Photos
 Glossary of Ichnology Terms

 
Paleozoology
Bioindicators